HD 120987 (y Centauri or y Cen) is a star system located in the constellation Centaurus. HD 120987 is a quintuple star system located 50 pc (163 light years) from the Sun. The system has an apparent magnitude of 5.565. Based on the system's parallax, it is located some 172 light-years (52 parsecs) away.

HD 120987 appears to be a single F-type star with the spectral classification F4V, but closer inspection reveals it to be two similar F-type main-sequence stars with spectral classifications of F0V and F1V, respectively. The two orbit each other every 373 years, and are separated by 1.519 arcseconds while taking a very eccentric orbit.

References 

Centaurus (constellation)
Centauri, y
F-type main-sequence stars
Binary stars
Durchmusterung objects
120987
067819
5222